Sedum morganianum, the donkey tail or burro's tail, is  a species of flowering plant in the family Crassulaceae, native to southern Mexico. S. morganianum has been found wild in two ravines at Tenampa county, in central Veracruz, in eastern Mexico and on vertical cliffs of igneous rock in the Tropical Deciduous Forest zone. Due to its restricted geographic distribution, it should be regarded as a micro-endemic species.

Cultivation

This plant has gained the Royal Horticultural Society's Award of Garden Merit.

Sedum morganianum grows well outside or indoors, in very good light but not extreme heat. The plant is best grown in full sunlight for strong growth and to enhance leaf coloration. It requires regular, moderate watering all year, except in winter, when it should be infrequently watered. Excess water can damage the plant in a short time.

Even at high latitudes leaves will readily propagate in south facing light (Northern Hemisphere) or north facing light (Southern Hemisphere). 

Plants are usually propagated by stem or leaf cuttings. The leaf attachment is quite delicate and leaves will readily break off the stem when manipulated. The leaves will stay alive for many days and roots will emerge after a few days, especially with local humidity. Individual leaves will produce inches-long plants. 

This plant exhibits a clear and visible wax layer on its leaves and/or stems.

Gallery

References

External links
Integrated Taxonomic Information System (ITIS)
CalPhotos: Sedum morganianum
Backyardgardener.com: Sedum morganianum

morganianum
Flora of Honduras
Garden plants of North America
Drought-tolerant plants
House plants
Flora of Chiapas
Flora of Puebla
Flora of Veracruz